Nightmare is a 1942 American film noir crime film directed by Tim Whelan and starring Diana Barrymore, Brian Donlevy. The film was based on a novel of the same name by Philip MacDonald.

Plot

Leslie Stafford (Diana Barrymore) is a secretary who seeks the help of a home invader, Daniel Shane (Brian Donlevy), to dispose of the body of her murdered husband in wartime London.

Cast
 Diana Barrymore as Leslie Stafford  Butch
 Brian Donlevy as Daniel Shane
 Henry Daniell as Capt. Stafford
 Eustace Wyatt as Angus - Innkeeper
 Arthur Shields as Sergeant
 Gavin Muir as J.B. Abbington
 Stanley Logan as Inspector Robbins
 Ian Wolfe as James - Abbington's Butler
 Hans Conried as Hans - Nazi Agent
 John Abbott as Karl a.k.a. Charles
 David Clyde as Jock
 Elspeth Dudgeon as Angus' Wife
 Harold De Becker as Jeff Hawkins - London Cabby
 Ivan F. Simpson as Arnold - Money Changer
 Keith Hitchcock as London Bobby
 Arthur Gould-Porter as Freddie
 Anita Sharp-Bolster as Mrs. McDonald - Housekeeper
 Lydia Bilbrook as Mrs. Bates
 Pax Walker as Gladys
 Bobbie Hale as Old Gaffer (as Bobby Hale)

References

External links
 
 
 
 Turner Classic Movies

1942 films
1940s spy films
American spy films
American black-and-white films
American mystery films
Films based on British novels
Films set in London
Films set in England
Films set in Scotland
Films directed by Tim Whelan
Universal Pictures films
Films scored by Frank Skinner
1940s English-language films
1940s American films